Delillers Carbonnel (born 1654) was a British banker who was Governor of the Bank of England from 1740 to 1741.

He was born in London, the son of Gillaume Carbonnel, a French Merchant.

He was Deputy Governor of the Bank of England from 1738 to 1740, when he replaced Thomas Cooke as governor, being succeeded in 1741 by Stamp Brooksbank.

See also
Chief Cashier of the Bank of England

References 

Governors of the Bank of England
1654 births
Year of death missing
British bankers
Deputy Governors of the Bank of England